Ömnögovi ( Ömnögovǐ, South Gobi) is an aimag (province) of Mongolia, located in the south of the country, in the Gobi Desert. Ömnögovi is Mongolia's largest aimag. The capital is Dalanzadgad.

The province is rich in mineral deposits, including gold and copper. Agriculture is of minor importance. Vegetables are grown in some oases, e.g. in Dal near Dalanzadgad.

As the aimag has various sights to offer, tourism is gaining importance. Ömnögovi includes several well known tourist areas, including the Flaming Cliffs, Gobi Gurvansaikhan National Park and Khongoryn Els - The Singing Sand Dunes.

Transportation 
The Dalanzadgad Airport (ZMDZ/DLZ) has one concrete runway. It is served by regular domestic flights from and to Ulaanbaatar.

Administrative subdivisions

Religion

According to a 2009 survey, 73.5% of the residents of Ömnögovi are Buddhists, 2.9% are Christians, 23.3% do not identify with a formal religion, and 0.3% adhere to other formal religions.

References

External links

 Ömnögovi aimag official website (in Mongolian)

 
Provinces of Mongolia
Gobi Desert
States and territories established in 1931
1931 establishments in Mongolia